Trønder rock is a music and cultural scene developed in the Trøndelag region of Norway in the early 1970s, in which bands and artists merged folk rock inspired rock and roll with cultural characteristics.

The term was first coined by journalist  in 1972, and has been described by Professor of Music Studies Ole Kai Ledang as "rock music with trøndersk tone". However, the term also often includes bands that sing in English, especially .

Today, the term has gained some further use, and is often used as a general term for artists and bands associated with Trøndelag.

References

Literature

External links 
Hva er Trønderrock?
Namsos Rock City music from the middle of Norway
Tidenes trønderrock
Siste video/lyd: Trønderrock
Full krig om trønderrocken

Culture in Trøndelag
Rock music genres
Norwegian styles of music
1970s in music